Immanuel Lutheran School is located in Perryville, Missouri.  It is a private school that serves 211 students in grades PK and K-8.  Immanuel Lutheran School is coed and is affiliated with the Lutheran Church–Missouri Synod.

History
Immanuel Lutheran School was consecrated on September 6, 1908.  The school originally instructed in both German and English.

Staff
Velda Hurtling is the principal of Immanuel Lutheran.

References

External links

Schools in Perry County, Missouri
Lutheran schools in Missouri
Private high schools in Missouri
Educational institutions established in 1908
1908 establishments in Missouri